Bye Bye Dubai  is a 2016 Indian Odia-language comedy drama film directed by Basanta Sahoo and produced by NRI businessman Akshay Kumar Parija. The music is released by Amara Muzik. It was declared as a Hit movie.

Cast
Sabyasachi Mishra
Archita Sahu
Buddhaditya Mohanty
Papu Pom Pom
Bijay Mohanty
Jiban Panda

Production
Filming for Bye Bye Dubai took place in Hyderabad, Ramoji, and Odisha, as well as Dubai, where they shot some of the film's song sequences.

Soundtrack

Critical reception

References

2010s Odia-language films
Films shot in Hyderabad, India
Films shot at Ramoji Film City
Films shot in Odisha
Films shot in Dubai